Samuel D. Cox (born December 26, 1961) is a retired United States Air Force lieutenant general who commanded the Eighteenth Air Force from 2015 to 2017.

References

 

 

 

1961 births
Living people
Recipients of the Air Force Distinguished Service Medal
Recipients of the Defense Superior Service Medal
Recipients of the Legion of Merit
United States Air Force generals
United States Air Force personnel of the Gulf War